The 2022–23 Scottish Junior Cup known as the Clydebuilt Home Improvements Scottish Junior Cup due to sponsorship reasons, is the 136th season of the Scottish Junior Cup, the national knockout tournament for member clubs of the Scottish Junior Football Association (SJFA). A total of 108 clubs have entered the competition, two fewer than in 2021–22. Auchinleck Talbot are the defending champions. 

Belshill Athletic, Darvel, Lossiemouth United, Royal Albert, Rutherglen Glencairn, and Vale Of Clyde are all taking part once again having rejoined the SJFA, and Banks O' Dee Junior are the newest member after Banks O' Dee promoting to Highland League. Meanwhile Annbank United, Fauldhouse, Girvan, Kello Rovers, Pollok, Renfrew, Spey Valley United, and Whitletts Victoria are not competing after declining to renew their SJFA membership. 

Buckie Rovers, Hall Russell United, and Whitehills are in abeyance, and Pumpherston Juniors did not compete.

Calendar 
The dates for each round of the 2022–23 tournament are as follows:

Drawn matches proceed direct to a penalty shootout, there is no extra time. The semi-finals and final are played at a neutral venue, prior to 2021–22 semi-finals were played home and away over two legs.

First round

Draw 
The first round draw took place at Hampden Park on 21 July 2022.

Clubs taking part in the Scottish Cup — Auchinleck Talbot, Benburb, Carnoustie Panmure, Cumnock Juniors, Darvel, Irvine Meadow XI, Lochee United, Rutherglen Glencairn, Syngenta, Tayport — received a bye into the second round draw, along with ten other clubs.

Matches

Second round

Draw 
The second round draw took place on the PLZ Soccer - The Football Show YouTube channel on 26 Aug 2022.

Clubs taking part in the Scottish Cup and the teams that received a bye all entered at this round.

Matches

Third round

Draw 
The third round draw took place on the PLZ Soccer - The Football Show YouTube channel on 16 Sep 2022.

Matches

Fourth round

Draw 
The fourth round draw took place on the at Clydebuilt Home Improvements Limited Offices on 28 Oct 2022.

Matches

Quarter-final

Draw 
The quarter final draw took place at Hampden Park on 2 December 2022.

Matches

Semi-final

Draw 
The semi final draw took place at Hampden Park on 14 February 2023

Matches

References 

Scottish Junior Cup seasons
Junior Cup